The Hugo Award for Best Series is one of the Hugo Awards given each year for science fiction or fantasy stories published or translated into English during the previous calendar year. The award is available for series of science fiction or fantasy stories consisting of at least 3 published works totaling at least 240,000 words, with at least one work released or translated into English during the previous calendar year. A losing finalist becomes eligible again with the publication of at least two new works totaling at least 240,000 words.

The Hugo Award for Best Series has been awarded annually since 2017. It was first presented in that year as a one-time special Hugo Award in advance of a vote to make it a permanent category, and was ratified as such by members of the World Science Fiction Society that year. An earlier series award was given to Isaac Asimov for his Foundation series in 1966 for Best All-Time Series. In addition to the regular Hugo Awards, beginning in 1996 Retrospective Hugo Awards, or "Retro-Hugos", have been available to be awarded for 50, 75, or 100 years prior. Retro-Hugos may only be awarded for years after 1939 in which no awards were originally given. A Retro-Hugo Award has been given for the series category once, in 2020, representing what could have been awarded in 1945.

Hugo Award nominees and winners are chosen by supporting or attending members of the annual World Science Fiction Convention, or Worldcon, and the presentation evening constitutes its central event. The selection process is defined in the World Science Fiction Society Constitution as instant-runoff voting with six nominees. The series on the ballot are the six most-nominated by members that year, with no limit on the number of series that can be nominated. Initial nominations of five series each are made by members in January through March, while voting on the ballot of six nominations is performed roughly in April through July, subject to change depending on when that year's Worldcon is held. Worldcons are generally held near the start of September, and are held in a different city around the world each year.

In the 7 nomination years, 38 series by 36 authors have been nominated, including co-authors and Retro-Hugos. Lois McMaster Bujold, James S. A. Corey (a pen-name for Daniel Abraham and Ty Franck), Seanan McGuire, Charles Stross, and Martha Wells all have received multiple nominations, with Bujold winning twice, for the Vorkosigan Saga and World of the Five Gods series, Wells winning once for The Murderbot Diaries and being nominated for The Books of the Raksura, and McGuire winning once for Wayward Children and being nominated three times for the October Daye series and twice for the InCryptid series. Corey was nominated twice for The Expanse, while Stross was nominated once each for The Laundry Files and The Merchant Princes series. McGuire and Corey are the only authors to be nominated more than once for the same series, and McGuire has the most nominations overall.

Winners and nominees
In the following table, the years correspond to the date of the ceremony, rather than when any work in the series was published. Entries with a blue background have won the award; those with a white background are the other nominated series.

  *   Winners and joint winners

Retro-Hugos 
Beginning with the 1996 Worldcon, the World Science Fiction Society gave Worldcons the option to award Retrospective Hugo Awards, or "Retro-Hugos", in addition to the regular nominations for the year. Retro-Hugos can be retroactively awarded for years 50, 75, or 100 years before the current year, if no awards were originally given that year. They have been awarded seven times, for 1939, 1941, 1943—1946, 1951, and 1954, though only once for series. Retro-Hugos for series do not note the original publishers.

References

External links

Series